The State of Origin for Bushfire Relief Match was a one-off all-star game between two representative sides organised by the Australian Football League to raise funds for recovery efforts following the 2019–20 Australian bushfire season.

The match was played on 28 February 2020 at Marvel Stadium in Melbourne, Australia, between Victoria (the "Big V") and the "All-Stars", with a crowd of 51,052 in attendance. Victoria won the match by 46 points.

History

On 9 January, the AFL announced a one-off benefit match would be played on 28 February 2020, as a fundraiser for the relief effort for the 2019–20 Australian bushfire season. The league donated $2.5 million to disaster relief funds in association with the match. Selection for the two teams was under state of origin rules – with players of Victorian origin eligible for Victoria, and all other players eligible for the All-Stars – and it was the first interstate representative match featuring AFL-listed players since the AFL Hall of Fame Tribute Match held in 2008.

Teams
On 18 February the AFL announced 27-player teams for each of the Victoria and All-Stars side. All AFL teams had at least one player selected in one of the sides. The match was played with an extended interchange bench of nine players instead of four.

Three late changes were made to the side due to injuries between the initial team announcement and the game itself, with Eddie Betts replacing Dayne Zorko in the All-Stars side and Travis Boak and Andrew Gaff replacing Robbie Gray and Ben Cunnington for Victoria.

Damien Hardwick and John Longmire were the coaches of Victoria and the All-Stars, respectively, and were also primarily responsible for selecting players for their sides.

Richmond captain Trent Cotchin and Fremantle captain Nat Fyfe were named to captain Victoria and the All-Stars, respectively.

Victoria

All-Stars

Best-on-ground award
The best-on-ground medal was awarded to Dustin Martin, who kicked two goals and had 23 disposals for Victoria.

Scorecard

See also

2020 AFL season
AFL Hall of Fame Tribute Match

References

Australian Football League
Australian rules football games
Australian rules football State of Origin
Hall of Fame
History of Australian rules football